The Sadharan Brahmo Samaj is a division of Brahmoism formed as a result of schisms in the Brahmo Samaj in 1866 and 1878 respectively.

It was formed in a public meeting of Brahmos held in the Town Hall of Calcutta on 15 May 1878 (2nd Jaishta 1284 of the Bengali calendar), which included Ananda Mohan Bose.

References

 The Sadharan Brahmo Samaj = The General Community of Worshippers of the One God.
 The movement was originally known as the Brahma Sabha (or Assembly of Brahman).
 A new premises at Chitpore (Jorasankoe) arranged by Dwarkanath Tagore.
 The appellation Brahmo Samaj (or Community of Brahman) was introduced in 1843 by Maharshi Devendra.Nath.Thakur for the Calcutta Brahmo Samaj.  The First Brahmo Schism of 1866 engendered the 2 modern branches of Brahmoism viz.  "Adi Brahmo Samaj" and "Sadharan Brahmo Samaj" (previously the general body of erstwhile Brahmo Samaj of India).

External links
 The Sadharan Brahmo Samaj
 Brahmo Samaj.net
 Brahmo Samaj in the Encyclopædia Britannica

Brahmoism
Anti-caste movements
Indian independence movement
New religious movements
Organisations based in Kolkata
Religion in Kolkata
Religious organisations based in India
Religious organizations established in 1878
1878 establishments in British India
Universalism